Daniel "Dani" Miguélez Martínez (born 23 April 1985) is a Spanish footballer who plays as a goalkeeper.

External links

Stats and bio at Cadistas1910 

1985 births
Living people
Footballers from Cádiz
Spanish footballers
Association football goalkeepers
Segunda División players
Segunda División B players
Tercera División players
Cádiz CF B players
Cádiz CF players
Granada CF footballers
Polideportivo Ejido footballers
Maltese Premier League players
Balzan F.C. players
Spanish expatriate footballers
Expatriate footballers in Malta